Autodromo Víctor Borrat Fabini is a motor racing circuit in El Pinar, Uruguay. It was inaugurated on 14 October 1956. The circuit features various layout configurations. The circuit currently hosts TCR South America Touring Car Championship and national championships, however it also hosted some continental championships and Argentian motorsport championships in the past. In 1999, "Gota de Agua" corner was discontinued, and "Beco" corner was built in the inner side of circuit. In 2017, the circuit was extended and discontinued "Gota de Agua" corner section was reasphalted.

Lap records 

The official race lap records at the Autódromo Víctor Borrat Fabini are listed as:

References

Sports venues in Uruguay
Motorsport venues in Uruguay
1956 establishments in Uruguay